The third season of the Croatian reality television show The Voice Hrvatska premiered on 7 December 2019, on HRT. Ivan Dečak returned as coach for his third season. New coaches Davor Gobac, Massimo Savić and Vanna joined the coaching panel, replacing Tony Cetinski, Jacques Houdek and Indira Levak, respectively.

Teams
Color key

Blind auditions
The Block button, which appeared in the US version of the franchise, was applied this season. Each coach had one block to prevent another coach from getting an artist.

Color key

Episode 1 (7 December)

Episode 2 (14 December)

Episode 3 (21 December)

Episode 4 (28 December)

Episode 5 (4 January)

The Knockouts

Color key:

Knockouts 1 (11 January)

Knockouts 2 (18 January)

Knockouts 3 (25 January)

Additional Battle Round

The Battles

Color key:

Live shows
Color key:

Week 1: Live Playoffs (9 February)

Week 2: Semifinal (15 February)

Week 3: Final (22 February)

References

External links

Croatia
2019 Croatian television seasons
2020 Croatian television seasons